The National Basketball League (NBL) is a men's semi-professional basketball league in New Zealand.

In 1981, a group of club and provincial teams came together to create a men's national basketball league. The following year, the league was brought under the management of the New Zealand Basketball Federation. The league quickly grew in size and popularity due to the influx of sponsors and American import players. The early 1990s held dwindling fortunes for New Zealand basketball, with reduced TV coverage, sponsorships, and crowd numbers. The sport's popularity increased in the 2000s with the success of the Tall Blacks and the introduction of the New Zealand Breakers in the Australian NBL.

In the early days, Auckland, Canterbury and Wellington were the benchmark teams of the league. During the 1990s, Auckland and Nelson were the teams to beat, before Waikato joined Auckland as the dominant sides during the 2000s. During the 2010s, Wellington and Southland became the league's premier teams.

History 
The 1980s ushered in a period of exceptional growth and popularity for basketball in New Zealand. Late in 1981, six men's teams – a mixture of club and provincial representative sides – went out alone and created an inaugural national league. It was enough of a success to come under the control of the New Zealand Basketball Federation the following year, when it grew in size and secured a naming sponsor. An allowance of two imported players (invariably Americans with college basketball experience) per team, and the fact that games were played in the evening indoors, helped turn the league into a new family entertainment option. Spectators filled gymnasiums and media coverage reached unprecedented levels. The early 1990s held dwindling fortunes for New Zealand basketball and many teams in the NBL, with reduced TV coverage, sponsorships, and crowd numbers. With the success of the Tall Blacks at the 2002 FIBA World Championship and the introduction of the New Zealand Breakers in the Australian NBL in 2003, basketball in New Zealand rose in popularity again.

The number of teams each season has constantly changed since the league's inception, with many promotions and relegations between the first division and second division during the 1980s and 1990s, as well as many withdrawals due to financial reasons. The league began with 8 teams in 1982, then peaked at 13 teams in 1995, before dropping to a low of 7 in 2016. In 2019, the Southern Huskies from Tasmania became the first ever Australian team to join a New Zealand competition. The league returned to 7 teams in 2020 following a revised small-scale format due to the coronavirus pandemic. In 2022, the league was hailed for reaching competitive balance after years of unbalanced competition, with evenly spread talent and resources across the ten teams.

Current teams

Expansion teams

Former and defunct teams 
 Auckland Pirates (2011–2012)
 Auckland Stars (1982–2009)
 Centrals (1982–1985)
 Christchurch Cougars (2009–2010)
 Harbour Heat (1986–2010, 2012)
 Hutt Valley Lakers (1990–1996)
 Northland Suns (1995–1998)
 Ponsonby (1984–1988)
 Porirua (1982–1983)
 Super City Rangers (1990–1995, 2013–2019)
 Waikato Pistons (1982, 1984–2011, 2013–2014)
 Waitemata Dolphins (1982–1983, 1988–1989)

League eligibility rules 
There are two categories of players in the NBL:
Non-Restricted Player – players eligible to play for New Zealand in FIBA competitions
Restricted Player – a player who is not eligible to play for New Zealand

Broadcasting details 
In 2016 and 2017, the NBL began to more freely livestream and broadcast their games. In 2020, the league had all 75 games broadcast by Sky Sport, marking the first time in the league's four-decade history that every game would be made available to viewers across the nation. That same year, the league secured a deal to broadcast live in the United States through ESPN.

In 2022, the NBL and Sky Sport signed a five-year commercial deal estimated to be worth $7.5 million for the teams.

Honours

List of Champions

Awards 

Current
Most Valuable Player
Finals MVP
Most Outstanding Guard
Most Outstanding NZ Guard
Most Outstanding Forward
Most Outstanding NZ Forward/Centre
Scoring Champion
Rebounding Champion
Assist Champion
Most Improved Player
Defensive Player of the Year
Youth Player of the Year
Coach of the Year
All-Star Five
Best Team Free Throws

Past
NZ Most Valuable Player

See also 
 Conference Basketball League
 List of National Basketball League (New Zealand) awards
 National Basketball League (Australia)
 New Zealand men's national basketball team
 Tauihi Basketball Aotearoa

References

External links 
 New Zealand NBL official website
 New Zealand NBL 2003 to 2006
 NZBL website 2001
 NZBL archive 2000/01
 New Zealand NBL career points leaders (as of 2009)
 Basketball New Zealand Results Archive
 Basketball: Several changes on the agenda for NZ NBL
 State of the NBL: National Basketball League at critical juncture
 Basketball: Tasmania's Southern Huskies set to join New Zealand National Basketball League
 Tasmanian franchise eyeing place in New Zealand's National Basketball League

 
Basketball leagues in New Zealand
1982 establishments in New Zealand
Sports leagues established in 1982
Professional sports leagues in New Zealand